WVC CSKA Moscow was a Russian women's volleyball club. It played in the Super League. The club won 3 CEV Women's Champions Leagues. 

In 2008, WVC CSKA Moscow was disbanded due to financial problems.

Titles

Domestic competitions 
Soviet Union
 USSR Championship (6)
  1965, 1966, 1968, 1969, 1974, 1985
  1938, 1962, 1972, 1973, 1977, 1979, 1982, 1987
  1958, 1975, 1980, 1988
 USSR Cup Winners (2) 
  1972, 1984
Russia
 Russian Super League:
  1994, 1995, 1996, 1997, 2007
  1992, 1993, 1998, 2000.
 Russian Cup: 3 
  1998, 2001, 2005

International competitions
  CEV Champions League: 3
  1965-66, 1966-67, 1985-86
  1967-68, 1968-69

  Cup Winners Cup: 4
  1972-73, 1973-74, 1987-88, 1997-98
  1974-75
  1988-89, 1995-96, 1996-97

  Top Teams Cup:
  2006-2007

  Women's Top Volley International:1
  1998 (December)
  1995

External links
The official web-site of the club

WVC
Russian volleyball clubs
Volleyball clubs established in 1936
1936 establishments in Russia
Volleyball clubs disestablished in 2008
2008 disestablishments in Russia